The DEx12 expressway, also known as the Pitești–Craiova Expressway, is a partially built expressway in the south-western part of Romania, previously labelled as A12, when it was considered as a future motorway. It will connect the cities of Pitești (branching off the A1 motorway), Slatina and Craiova (where it is planned to merge with the also planned A6 motorway), being 121 km long, with an estimated total cost of 1.66 billion euro.

As of 28 July 2022, only the Slatina - Balș segment is in service, totaling .

History
While planned as a motorway, the construction was tendered as a concession contract in March 2013, that should have been awarded until December 2013. It was also yet to be decided whether it would be built as a motorway or an expressway.

In April 2017, it was suggested for the first time that this road will be an express road and not a motorway. Despite receiving criticism in the media for this switch, the road was tendered in November 2017.

It is split into four sections. The contracts for the sections 1 and 2 were awarded in October 2018 to the Italian company Tirrena Scavi and the Romanian company Spedition UMB, respectively, while those for the sections 3 and 4 had been signed in September 2020 with the Romanian joint-venture SA&PE Construct-Spedition UMB-Tehnostrade, without waiting for the decisions of the Bucharest Court of Appeal, the bids being challenged by several other participants. Initially, the first tenders for the sections 3 and 4, launched during 2017, had been canceled in August 2018 due to other participants challenging them, being launched again during 2019.

Works on section 3 were allowed to begin in May 2021, but the contract for section 4 was terminated by the Bucharest Court of Appeal, who obliged the CNAIR to review the bids of the Chinese company China Railway, of the Turkish company Nurol, and of the Italian company Rizzani, all who challenged the winning bid for the said section. In August 2021, the contract for section 4 was signed again with the same Romanian joint-venture with which the first contract was signed.

Among companies asking for the expressway works to begin as soon as possible was the automaker Ford, who has a car plant in Craiova. Due to this, the expressway is sometimes referred to as the Autostrada Ford (Ford motorway). In May 2021, the CNAIR submitted a request for the financing of a feasibility study and technical project for what could be a new connecting road between National Road 6 near the Ford Craiova plant and the DEx12 expressway.

In March 2022, construction works for section 4 began. However, on the 21st December, the contract for section 1, with Tirrena Scavi, was cancelled. The progress for the execution of the section currently sits at 58.26%.

Openings timeline
21 April 2022: Slatina - Balș (16.0 km)
28 July 2022: the Slatina bypass (21.3 km)

Exit list

See also
Roads in Romania
Transport in Romania

References

External links
Map of the planned motorway route
CNADNR – Craiova – Pitești 

Expressways in Romania